Arakhley is a fresh water body in the Chita District, Zabaykalsky Krai, Russia. It is the 208th lake in Russia in water surface. The villages of Arakhley and Preobrazhenka are located near the lakeshore. Arakhley is a locally well-known tourist destination and there are a number of resorts by the lake.

Geography
Arakhley lake has a roughly oval shape. It is located in the Beklemishev Depression, at the southeastern end of the Vitim Plateau, west of Chita, Zabaykalsky Krai and lake Kenon.

It is part of the Ivan-Arakhley Lake System, which includes 6 large lakes and about 20 smaller ones. Arakhley is the largest of the group and it is also the lake having the greatest depth.

There are two small rivers flowing into the lake, the Domka and the Gryaznukha, also known as Shaborta. The Kholoy stream flows out of the lake into Lake Shaksha. The  catchment area of the lake belongs to the Khilok river basin, a tributary of the Selenga.

Flora and fauna
The lake is surrounded by larch taiga, interspersed with areas of forest steppe and meadows. In the waters there are aquatic plants. 

The water of the lake is fresh and the main fish species in it are roach, perch, dace, pike, chebak, "bulus", minnow, crucian carp, peled, bream, carp and catfish. The fauna of the lake has suffered degradation in the past few decades and commercial fisheries have declined.

See also
List of lakes of Russia

References

External links

«Уху евшие»: На Арахлее стал ловиться крупный чебак 
Arakhley